Chilakalguda is a residential neighbourhood of Secunderabad, India.

It is predominantly a middle-class neighbourhood with rich of culture, and is located half kilometer away from the Secunderabad Railway Station. Residential Quarters for Employees of South Central Railway are located here. Gandhi Statue is one of the predominant places in the area. The neighbourhoods of Chilakalguda include Padmarao Nagar, Sitaphalmandi, Namalagundu, Parsigutta and Mylargadda.

Transport
Chilakalguda is well connected by road. TSRTC buses shuttles from the area to all parts of the city. The closest MMTS station is at Sitaphalmandi. The nearest Metro Station to Chilakalguda is Secunderabad East Metro Station.

Culture
A few of spiritual sites in the locality include Hanuman temple, Katta Maisamma-Nalla Pochamma temple, Jamia Masjid, Masjid Ahle-Hadith, EIDGAH and the C.S.I. Wesley Church.

Festivals
Ganesh Festival, Bonalu spirits roar high in this Area.

References

Neighbourhoods in Hyderabad, India